Gene Kerrigan is an Irish journalist and novelist who grew up in Cabra in Dublin. His works include political commentary on Ireland since the 1970s in such publications as Magill magazine and the Sunday Independent newspaper. He has also written about Ireland for International Socialism magazine.

His book The Rage won the 2012 Gold Dagger for the best crime novel of the year. Marilyn Stasio, in a 2014 review of Dark Times in the City, comments that Kerrigan "writes with a grim elegance".

List of works
Non-Fiction
  with Derek Dunne
 
  with Derek Speirs
 
  and Gill & Macmillan 
 
  with Pat Brennan
 
 
 

Fiction
 , also Random House and Europa
 , also Europa Editions

References

External links
 Gene Kerrigan at the Sunday Independent
 Police Interrogation Endangers the Innocent PDF format, 290 KB
 Kerrigan's entry at Ricorso, the Irish writers' database

Year of birth missing (living people)
People from Cabra, Dublin
20th-century Irish people
Irish columnists
Irish journalists
Irish novelists
Irish male novelists
Irish mystery writers
Magill people
Sunday Independent (Ireland) people
Living people